This article is a list of historic places in Kings County, New Brunswick entered on the Canadian Register of Historic Places, whether they are federal, provincial, or municipal.

List of historic places

See also
 List of historic places in New Brunswick
 List of National Historic Sites of Canada in New Brunswick

Kings County, New Brunswick
Historic